The Chittagong Hill Tracts lies in the south-eastern part of Bangladesh adjoining international boundaries with Myanmar on the southeast, the Indian states of Tripura on the north and Mizoram on the east. The Chittagong Hill Tracts, formally a single unified district was divided into three separate districts: Khagrachari, Bandarban, and Rangamati during the administrative reorganization in 1984.

Tribes in CHT 
In Bangladesh there are many tribal people living in Sylhet, Dinajpur, Cox's Bazar, Mymensingh, Rajshahi etc. But the majority of tribal people live in Chittagong Hill tracts. It is the home of eleven tribes, the most beautiful indigenous people of Bangladesh. In this hilly area of immense beauty, eleven ethnic groups such as Chakma, Marma, Tripura, Tanchangya, Lushai, Pankho, Bawm, Mro, Khyang, Khumi and Chak live in harmony with nature. Among all of them the Chakma are the largest ethnic group in Bangladesh. The majority of them are Buddhists and the rest of them are Hindus, Christians etc. Also a good number of mainstream Bengali live in this area but their appearance, language and cultural traditions are markedly different from other Bengali-speaking people living in this area.

The tribal people of CHT lead an extremely interesting and attractive but simple life. 
The tribal families are matriarchal and female is the head of a family. In their community the women are more hard-working than the male and basically they are the main productive force. The tribal people are extremely independent and self-confident. They grow their own food by Zum cultivation. Their girls weave their own cloths and they are very skillful in making beautiful handicrafts also. By selling the cloths and the handicrafts they earn some money and helps their family. The common feature is their way of life, which still speaks of their main occupation. Some of them still take pride in hunting with bows and arrows.

Culture 
The culture of this tribal people is also very colorful. The greatest cultural festival of this people is the "Baisabi utsab". In Chittagong hill tracts all the tribal communities celebrate the festival in the same way. The only difference is the name. The Chakma  calls it 'Biju', Tanchangya calls it Bishu, the Tripura calls it 'Baisu' and the Marma 'Sangrai' and the first 2-3 words of all the three names form the word 'Baisabi'. They celebrate the day from April 12 to 14 to say goodbye to the outgoing Bangla year and to welcome the New year.

In Chittagong Hill Tracts each tribe has its own dialect, distinctive dress, rites and rituals. But despite of these distinctive features there are strong bonds between them. They are generally peace-loving, honest, and hospitable.

References 

Social groups of Bangladesh